Nick Crumpton (born 1986) is a British zoologist and children's author.

Education and research career 
Crumpton holds a BSc in ecology from the University of Leeds, and an MSc in palaeobiology from the University of Bristol, for which he was awarded the Geologists Association's Curry Prize. He gained his PhD from the University of Cambridge with research undertaken at the Department of Zoology. 

He has held post-doctoral research posts at the Zoological Society of London and University College London and undertaken field work in Indonesia and North America. His research has centered on ecomorphology and functional anatomy, convergent evolution, mammalian evolution during the Mesozoic era, and recent mammal biodiversity in the Caribbean and Indonesia. He has helped describe three species of mammals new to science. He sits on the council of the Systematics Association and is a Fellow of the Linnean Society.

Books 
Crumpton's first non-fiction book for children, Triassic Terrors, illustrated by Isaac Lenkiewicz, was published by Flying Eye Books in 2012 and introduced readers to less commonly known non-dinosaur animals from the Triassic period. This was followed by The Amazing Animal Atlas in 2017, illustrated by Gaia Bordicchia. The latter book presented an array of animals found on Earth, with an emphasis on lesser known species. 

The first two books in a series of three, Why Do Dogs Sniff Bottoms and Why Do Cats Meow, were published in 2020 by Thames & Hudson, illustrated by Lily Snowden-Fine.

Media and public engagement 
Crumpton was awarded a British Science Association Media Fellowship in 2012 and spent this time at the BBC Radio Science Unit and the Science and Environment news website and has made film and radio segments for the BBC. He has acted as scientific consultant on natural history television series, BBC Bitesize online games and publishers including Ladybird, Lonely Planet and Phaidon. He has also appeared on BBC and CBBC television programmes, BBC Radio, the Naked Scientists podcast, and has written for the Guardian newspaper. He has spoken at the Cambridge Science Festival, the Hay Festival of Literature & Arts and the Bath Children's Literature Festival and worked as a professional science communicator at the Natural History Museum, London.

References 

British zoologists
British writers

1986 births
Living people